San Base (December 1, 1956 in Russia) is a contemporary Canadian artist specializing in generative art.

He graduated from school of Fine Arts in 1974, and received his PhD in Cybernetics from the Technical University in 1979.

Life and work

San Base used to work out complex computer codes in various visual applications when he began to see a possibility of combining his long standing interest in art with sophisticated mathematical approaches, and thus employing new electronic media for his artistic creations.

In 2002 San Base devised his "Dynamic Painting" algorithm, which allowed him to place an art object on a computer screen and make it not static, but changing and transforming with time. Dynamic Painting technology uses powerful video cards to generate real-time images that rival those seen in conventional contemporary painting.

Since 1996 San Base lives and works in Toronto.

Exhibitions
Gallery Gora Montreal, Canada
ArtEscapes Valencia, Spain
Yorkville TPL Toronto, Canada
Grifon gallery Izhevsk Russia
GA2007 Milan, Italy
ARTPOLIGON Omsk Russia

Sources
 San Base And Dynamic Painting

External links
 San Base home page
 San Base Studio

Canadian digital artists
Living people
Year of birth missing (living people)